The West Africa Cable System (WACS) is a submarine communications cable linking South Africa with the United Kingdom along the west coast of Africa that was constructed by Alcatel-Lucent. The cable consists of four fibre pairs and is 14,530 km in length, linking from Yzerfontein in the Western Cape of South Africa to London in the United Kingdom. It has 14 landing points, 12 along the western coast of Africa (including Cape Verde and Canary Islands) and 2 in Europe (Portugal and England) completed on land by a cable termination station in London. The total cost for the cable system is $650 million.
WACS was originally known as the Africa West Coast Cable (AWCC) and was planned to branch to South America but this was dropped and the system eventually became the West African Cable System.

Landing points
The cable has landed in the following countries and locations:

South Africa, Western Cape, Yzerfontein
Namibia, Swakopmund
Angola, Sangano near Luanda
Democratic Republic of Congo, Muanda
Republic of Congo, Matombi near Pointe Noire
Cameroon, Limbe, near Douala 
Nigeria, Lekki, near Lagos
Togo, Afidenyigba near Lomé
Ghana, Nungua near Accra
Ivory Coast, Abidjan
Cape Verde, Palmarejo near Praia
Canary Islands, Telde(el Goro) near Las Palmas
Portugal, Sesimbra near Seixal
United Kingdom, Brean near Highbridge (fiber link is extended by underground cable to London)

The landings in Namibia, the DRC, the Republic of Congo and Togo will provide the first direct connections for these countries to the global submarine cable network. While all earlier submarine cables were terminated at South Africa's international submarine gateways in Melkbosstrand or Mtunzini the WACS cable has been landed at Yzerfontein in order to reduce risk of complete isolation from the rest of the world in the case of damages by earthquakes or a large ship dragging its anchor.

Design capacity
The planned design capacity of WACS was 3.84 Tbit/s when the project agreement was signed in 2008.
When delivered in 2012 the initial design capacity was 5.12Tbit/s.
An upgrade delivered by Huawei Marine in December 2015 using WDM Soft Decision FEC and bit interleaved coded modulation advanced decoders permitting the design capacity to be increased to 14.5Tbit/s.

Innovations
Instead of powering the 236 undersea optical amplifiers and the 12 Submarine branching units along the cable by a single conductor which would require the voltage to be well over 12,000 to 14,000 V in the order of some 24,000 V DC, the system is supplied by two independent rings from Europe to West Africa and West Africa to South Africa, thus reducing the power requirements to around 12,000 V DC.
Branching units are designed to keep the main trunk intact in case of failure. Repairing a branch will not affect the traffic on the main cable.
Landing stations support wavelength pass through which means a wavelength coming into a landing station does not just stop there but carries on. This feature allows future upgrade to be carried out without the necessity to have to upgrade each landing point.

Topology
One of the four fibre pairs is a direct route from South Africa to Europe, a so-called express lane. The second and third fibre pairs are designed as a semi-express lane, one with two hops, from South Africa to West Africa and West Africa to Europe and the other with three stops. The fourth fibre pair is an omnibus fibre that stops off at all landing ports en route.
Fibre Pair one known as the Express lane (South Africa and Portugal)
Fibre Pair two (South Africa to Nigeria to Portugal)
Fibre Pair three (South Africa to Angola to DRC to Ivory Coast to Portugal)
Fibre Pair four (All WACS Landing Stations)

Construction and ownership
The following South African companies were announced as participants in the construction and maintenance of the cable system. MTN Group has invested $90 million in the cable making it the largest investor, and in return will receive 11% of the initial capacity of the cable.

MTN Group: a South African-based regional mobile operator
Neotel: South Africa's second fixed line operator - Liquid Telecom bought Neotel in 2018/19
Telkom South Africa: South Africa's incumbent fixed line operator
Vodacom: a South African-based regional mobile operator
Gateway Communications: a pan-African wholesale connectivity and telecommunications provider
Broadband Infraco: a South African state-owned telecom infrastructure company

On 8 April 2009, the following companies signed the WACS Construction and Maintenance Agreement and formed the final consortium: The WACS consortium includes 12 companies:
Vodacom
Togo Telecom
Telkom (South Africa)
Telecom Namibia
Tata Communications/Neotel
Portugal Telecom/Cabo Verde Telecom
Office Congolais des Postes et Telecommunications
MTN Group
Congo telecom
Cable & Wireless Worldwide
Broadband Infraco
Angola Cables

The supply contract was signed the same day between the consortium members and Alcatel-Lucent Submarine Networks.

Subsea cable laying operations began 15 July 2010 with the departure of Île de Bréhat vessel from Alcatel-Lucent's submarine cable's factory of Calais loaded with almost 6000 km of submarine cables.
The cable was simultaneously laid by Alcatel-Lucent's cable ships Île de Bréhat and her sister ship Île de Sein. Subsea cable laying operations were officially finished 19 April 2011 with the landing of the cable on a Yzerfontein's beach in South Africa.

The cable became operational on 11 May 2012 by the launching of the cable in South Africa

The 4-fibre pair submarine cable system was constructed at an approximate total project cost of US$650 million.

See also 
List of international submarine communications cables

Individual cable systems off the west coast of Africa include:
 ACE
 ATLANTIS-2
 GLO-1
 Main One
 SAT-2
 SAT-3/WASC

Other African submarine communications cables:
 LION
 SAFE
 SEACOM
 EASSy
 TEAMS

Other African terrestrial communications cables:
 CAB
 BRICS

References

Submarine communications cables in the North Atlantic Ocean
Submarine communications cables in the South Atlantic Ocean
Submarine communications cables in the Atlantic Ocean
2012 establishments in Africa
2012 establishments in Europe